Reliance MediaWorks Limited (RMW) is a film and entertainment services company and a member of the Reliance Group.

The company is one of India's film and entertainment services companies with a presence across several media businesses including the theatrical exhibition of films, television content production and distribution, and film and media services. The company facilities have been MPAA certified. Services provided by the company include Motion Picture Processing and DI, Digital Distribution, Audio Restoration and Image Enhancement, 2D to 3D conversion, Digital Master, Studios and Equipment rentals, Visual Effects, Animation and Post Production for TV Advertisements. RMW's operations are spread across India, UK and the US.

RMW’s television venture BIG Synergy is engaged in the television programming industry housing popular shows such as Kaun Banega Crorepati and Indian Idol.

Reliance MediaWorks’ sound stages have also been utilized for events such as The Filmfare Awards, the movies Singham and Agneepath, and numerous television commercials.

History

2005–2008
The company was initially established as Adlabs Films Limited in 1975 by Manmohan Shetty. The company began to expand into the film industry and in 2001, the company entered the multiplex business, setting up the world’s largest 3D IMAX screen in Mumbai.

In 2005, the Reliance ADA Group became a majority stake holder in Adlabs, and in 2009, it was renamed Reliance MediaWorks Limited.

2008–2009
RMW expanded by setting up Asia’s first Digital Intermediate Lab with a 4K facility. The lab was accredited by the Federation Against Copyright Theft.

In 2008, RMW acquired a 100% stake in Lowry Digital, a renowned image restoration and enhancement services company based in Burbank, California. Working on projects such as Avatar, The Curious Case of Benjamin Button and The Social Network, RMW’s Burbank branch developed working relationships with Hollywood studios.

RMW also began to restore approximately 1,000 films from the National Film Archive of India.

On the 40th anniversary of the moon landing on 16 July 2009, NASA tasked RMW to restore original video footage of the missing Apollo moon landing tapes. Neil Armstrong expressed his appreciation, stating that "your restored video is now a valuable contribution to space exploration and space communication history…thanks for all you did beyond the call of duty. Our grandchildren and their grandchildren will benefit."

2010
In early 2010, RMW acquired iLAB UK, a film processing and post production facility located in Soho, London.

By May 2010, the company commissioned a Media BPO in Airoli, Mumbai in order to handle projects exclusively for international clientele. RMW’s Airoli facility was utilized to initiate a 2D-to-3D conversion BPO, an Animation studio and a VFX setup. The Airoli office also housed an image restoration facility where the company continued to work on restoring films from the National Film Archive of India.

The company expanded its offerings to their domestic clientele, commencing an equipment rental facility for cameras, lights and grips, and establishing a post facility for broadcast television clients in Mumbai’s western suburbs. Projects they catered to included Dus Ka Dum, Jhalak Dikhla Ja and Femina Miss India.

In September, RMW created a VFX setup for India’s domestic film market in their Film City Office.

By December, a team of artists were recruited to cater specifically for international clients in their Airoli office.

Towards the end of 2010, RMW received an award in Creativity and Innovation from the Hollywood Post Alliance.

2011 
In early 2011, RMW commissioned one of Mumbai’s largest indoor sound stages.

In March 2011, RMW received a patent called "Obsidian" for creating a method for removing semi-transparent artifacts from digital images caused by contaminants in the camera’s optical path. This process received a significant amount of recognition within the entertainment industry, resulting in RMW receiving a Scientific and Technical Oscar from The Academy of Motion Picture Arts and Sciences.

RMW delved deeper into 3D film consulting, providing support during film shoots and advising filmmakers on 3D image alignments.

By the end of year, the company had provided post production services for 110 out of 114 Bollywood films that released in 2011.

2012
In September 2012, RMW along with China’s Galloping Horse acquired post production assets from Digital Domain, a legendary Hollywood studio founded by James Cameron. The takeover (known as Digital Domain v 3.0) allowed RMW to participate in projects such as The Amazing Spider-Man, Transformers: Dark of the Moon, John Carter, The Smurfs, Green Lantern and Ender's Game.

2013
By 2013, Reliance MediaWorks expanded its business by teaming with a variety of production companies as equity investors. Hiring Academy Award winning George Murphy as the company’s Chief Creative Officer in April 2013, RMW signed multimillion-dollar deals with Ethyrea Films and Random Cow.

In August 2013 RMW signed director Vadim Perelman as their Creative Director in India. The following month, the company tied up with Turner International India for post production services of its entertainment channels.

2014

In 2014, Reliance Mediaworks and Prime Focus merged. It sold big cinemas to Kochi based Carnival cinemas for around 700 crores in 2014. Big cinemas have now been rebranded as carnival cinemas.

Awards
 RMW received an Oscar in Scientific and Technical Excellence from the Academy of Motion Pictures Arts and Sciences in 2012 for its development of a unique and efficient system for "Reduction of noise and other disturbances", thereby providing high-quality images required in the film-making process.

Recent credits
Ninja Hattori-kun (2012 anime)
Transformers 3: Dark of the Moon –
Don 2 – 3 D Conversion
Conan the Barbarian – 3D Conversion and VFX
Expendables 2 – VFX
G.I. Joe: Retaliation – VFX
Star Wars Trilogy – Restoration and 3D Conversion
The Conspirator – VFX
Rock of Ages – VFX
Paranoia – VFX
Chennai Express – VFX

References

Mass media companies based in Mumbai
Reliance Group subsidiaries
Mass media companies established in 1975
Companies listed on the Bombay Stock Exchange
1975 establishments in Maharashtra